Classic Hall is a multi-purpose indoor arena located in Olinda, Brazil.

The arena was opened on August 8, 2001, and is considered as one of the largest concert halls in Latin America, with a stage of 1,000 square meters, and in a total area of 2.7 hectares.

In July 2004, American automobile company Chevrolet announced that it would be acquiring the naming rights for the arena, which became Chevrolet Hall. In 2015, the arena was renamed Classic Hall.

Concerts
The following is a list of concerts, showing date, artist or band, tour, opening acts, attendance and revenue held at Classic Hall.

External links

References

Indoor arenas in Brazil